

Group A

Head coach:  Ēriks Miļuns

Head coach:  Valeri Bragin

Head coach:  Ernest Bokroš

Head coach:  Roger Rönnberg

Head coach:  Manuele Celio

Group B

Head coach:  Don Hay

Head coach:  Miroslav Prerost

Head coach:  Todd Bjorkstrand

Head coach:  Raimo Helminen

Head coach:  Dean Blais

External links
IIHF.com

Rosters
World Junior Ice Hockey Championships rosters